This is about the Thunder Bay publication published 2001-2012. For the merged Toronto-based publication, see Kanadan Sanomat
{{Infobox Newspaper
| name                = Canadan Sanomat
| image               = 
| caption             = 
| type                = Weekly newspaper
| format              = Tabloid
| foundation          = 2001-2012 Merged with Vapaa Sana to form Kanadan Sanomat| ceased publication  = 
| price               = $1.60
| owners              = Independent
| publisher           = Vapaa Sana Press Ltd.
| editor              = 
| chiefeditor         = 
| assoceditor         = 
| staff               = 
| language            = Finnish 
| political           = 
| circulation         = 
| headquarters        = 314 Bay StreetThunder Bay, Ontario, Canada
| oclc                = 
| ISSN                = 
| website             = Canada Sanomat
}}Canadan Sanomat was a weekly Finnish language newspaper in Thunder Bay, Ontario, Canada. It was headquartered in the Finnish Labour Temple.

The paper was published by Vapaa Sana Press Ltd.Canadan Sanomat was launched by Aarre Ertolahti, who had been employed at Canadan Uutiset during its final phase as well as briefly in the 1970s. Dating back to 1915, Canadan Uutiset had been published in Thunder Bay. Earlier it had been close to the League of Loyal Finns (a right wing Finnish central organization in Canada, opposed to the Finnish Organization of Canada). However, for decades, Canadan Uutiset had been a Finnish community paper in Thunder Bay, without appreciable political color. Nationally, Canadan Uutiset was a competitor to the Toronto-based Vapaa Sana. In 1995, Canadan Uutiset was bought by a Florida-based Finnish newspaper owner. The entire "Uutiset Group" of newspapers ran into difficulties though and Canadan Uutiset closed down after the Christmas issue came out in December 2000.Canadan Sanomat was founded in April 2001 after an interim period with no Finnish language paper being published in Thunder Bay. In 2004, Vapaa Sana Press Ltd. (the publisher of  Vapaa Sana, Toronto)  purchased the Canadan Sanomat publication rights. Vapaa Sana Press Ltd. has continued the publication of Canadan Sanomat in its traditional form. In late 2011, Canadan Sanomat started printing twice a month, instead of the earlier weekly basis. In contrast, to Vapaa Sana (Toronto), Canadan Sanomat had no English section and advertises itself as the "most Finnish newspaper in Canada".

Kanadan Sanomat

In April 2012, the owners of Vapaa Sana Press Ltd. announced that their two newspapers, Vapaa Sana published in Toronto, and Canadan Sanomat published in Thunder Bay, would be merged in late 2012, with all publishing offices moved to Toronto. The new newspaper would be named Kanadan Sanomat'', with the country spelled with a "K", as is customary in the Finnish language.

See also
Vapaa Sana
The Chronicle-Journal
List of newspapers in Canada

External links
Canada Sanomat 

Finnish Canadian
Newspapers published in Thunder Bay
Weekly newspapers published in Ontario
Multicultural and ethnic newspapers published in Canada